Paul Accola (born 20 February 1967 in Davos) is a Swiss former Alpine skier. He came in first in the overall World Cup in 1992, and won a total of four medals at the Winter Olympics and World Championships in the combined event.

By the end of his career, he won seven world cup victories and was on the podium 26 times, the last time being in 2000. In 2002 Accola suffered a serious ankle injury, breaking both of his talus bones. In February 2005, on his 38th birthday, Accola announced that he would retire as alpine skier after nearly two decades in the sport.

He is the sixth Swiss athlete to compete at five Olympics, after middle-distance runner Paul Martin, equestrians Henri Chammartin and Gustav Fischer, javelin thrower Urs von Wartburg and equestrian Christine Stückelberger.

In 2012, Accola was found not liable by Swiss courts of accidentally running over and killing a child with a riding mower, as he was found to have told the nearby children not to play in the area where he was mowing multiple times.

He is the brother of fellow former alpine skier Martina Accola.

World Cup victories

See also
 List of athletes with the most appearances at Olympic Games

References

External links
 
 
 

1967 births
Living people
Romansh people
Swiss male alpine skiers
Olympic alpine skiers of Switzerland
Olympic bronze medalists for Switzerland
Alpine skiers at the 1988 Winter Olympics
Alpine skiers at the 1992 Winter Olympics
Alpine skiers at the 1994 Winter Olympics
Alpine skiers at the 1998 Winter Olympics
Alpine skiers at the 2002 Winter Olympics
Olympic medalists in alpine skiing
FIS Alpine Ski World Cup champions
People from Davos
Medalists at the 1988 Winter Olympics
Sportspeople from Graubünden